Xylanimonas cellulosilytica is a Gram-positive, xylanolytic, aerobic, coccoid and non-motile bacterium from the genus Xylanimonas which has been isolated from a decayed tree (Ulmus nigra) in Salamanca, Spain. Xylanimonas cellulosilytica has the ability to hydrolyze cellulose and xylan.

References

Further reading

External links
Type strain of Xylanimonas cellulosilytica at BacDive -  the Bacterial Diversity Metadatabase

Micrococcales
Bacteria described in 2003